The Satanas Gang (aka Ese Te Ese or STS) is a Filipino American street gang in Southern California, founded in 1972. It is believed to be the oldest Filipino-American street gang in Los Angeles.

History
Satanas began as a clique from Temple Street that broke off in the 1970s. This was not an acrimonious split, and they retain warm relations to this day.
In 1972, a car club group started in the Los Angeles area by some Filipino Americans who had formed a cultural bond where they were a minority. At first the club was exclusively for Filipinos. Other Filipinos came to socialize with this club. They soon branched out to other Southern California cities including  San Diego, La Puente, Cerritos, Oxnard Long Beach, Eagle Rock, Norwalk, San Fernando, West Covina, Chino, Chino Hills, Santa Ana, San Gabriel, El Monte, Delano, Palmdale, Antelope Valley, Vallejo, and San Jose and have reached other states out in the east coast like New Jersey and New York.

Some other Filipino gangs such as the Demonios and Diablos (not the Mexican gang of the same name) claim their roots to Satanas, having originated amongst second generation STS members and younger siblings of individuals who were members of STS; and the founders of many other Filipino American gangs were originally members of Satanas.

Since there were cultural similarities between the Filipinos and Mexicans, many of Ese Te Ese's older members and leaders allied with Chicano gangs in its early years within their surrounding neighbors. Accounts of Los Angeles gang history often placed both Filipinos and Mexicans side by side with each other during various street wars.

Notable crimes

Francisco Gamez and Luis Silva

In December 1982, eight members of the Satanas gang were found guilty in a trial for the killing of Francisco Gamez and Luis Silva who were not gang members but were mistaken as ones. Gamez and Silva chased two cars each carrying four members of Satanas. Gunshots had been fired from the two cars just behind the Gamez home. Gamez and Silva gave chase for at least two miles. At the end of the chase, Gamez was shot in the head and Silva was shot in the back, shoulder and head as he tried to escape.

Manuel Rodriguez

In November 1989 Manuel Rodriguez, a member of the Lemonwood Chiques gang, was shot and killed by Arnell Salagubang, a member of the Satanas gang. Salagubang and Manuel Rodriguez had been arguing in front of Channel Islands High School. Salagubang pulled out a small caliber handgun and shot Rodriguez in the head. Salagubang fled the scene, but a witness was able to get his license plate number.  The witness turned the information over to the police who arrested Salagubang the next day.

References

See also
Youth Groups and Youth Savers: Gangs, Crews, and the Rise of Filipino American Youth Culture in Los Angeles
City of Glendale Gang Training Manual (PDF)
Los Angeles Times
FilAms in crossfire as LA gang violence rages
Family Denies Slain Man a Gang Member
Leader of Violent California Gang Sentenced, FBI

Organizations established in 1972
1972 establishments in California
Asian-American gangs
Street gangs
Gangs in Los Angeles
Filipino-American culture in California